The 1954 Wightman Cup was the 26th edition of the annual competition between the United States and Great Britain. It was held at the All England Lawn Tennis and Croquet Club in London in England in the United Kingdom.

References

Wightman Cups by year
Wightman Cup, 1954
Wightman Cup
Wightman Cup
Wightman Cup
Wightman Cup